"Heaven" is a song by the American new wave band Talking Heads from their 1979 album Fear of Music. It was also featured as the second song in Talking Heads' 1984 concert film, Stop Making Sense. The lyrics refer to heaven as a "place where nothing ever happens", and describe a bar, a party, and a kiss.  The song has been called "the calm after their unusual ominous storm" by AllMusic as well as something "psychologists would certainly have a field day with" by author and The Guardian journalist Ian Gittins.

Dave Bell, writing for quarterly UK magazine Ceasefire, argued that the song "epitomises pop as Samuel Beckett might write it: tedious, beautiful and desperate".

Cover versions 
In 1996 the song was covered by Jimmy Scott who also made it the title track of his album, Heaven.

The song was covered by Eric Burdon on his 2004 album My Secret Life and in 1985 by Simply Red for their album Picture Book.

In 1980, a german cover named "Der Weg in die Ferne" was recorded by Joachim Witt for his album Silberblick.

Singer Q Lazzarus covered "Heaven" for the 1993 film Philadelphia. This song has never been available in its complete form.

References

1979 songs
Talking Heads songs
Eric Burdon songs
Simply Red songs
Songs written by David Byrne
Song recordings produced by David Byrne
Song recordings produced by Brian Eno
Songs written by Jerry Harrison
Songs written by Chris Frantz
Songs written by Tina Weymouth
Song recordings produced by Jerry Harrison